Anatoli Yevgenyevich Kisurin (born 23 December 1969; died 15 April 2014) was a Russian professional football player.

Club career
He played in the Russian Football National League for FC Irtysh Omsk in 1992.

Honours
 Russian Second Division Zone Siberia top scorer: 1994 (18 goals).

External links
 

1969 births
Living people
Soviet footballers
Russian footballers
FC Luch Vladivostok players
FC Sodovik Sterlitamak players
FC Irtysh Omsk players
Association football forwards
Association football midfielders
FC Amur Blagoveshchensk players